Uranophora eucyane is a moth of the subfamily Arctiinae. It was described by Cajetan Felder in 1874. It is found in Brazil.

References

Euchromiina
Moths described in 1874